Kaddouri and many other transliterations is a surname. 

Kaddouri may also refer to:

 Kadoorie Agricultural High School, an agricultural school and youth village in Israel
 Kadoorie Farm and Botanic Garden, Hong Kong
 Kadoorie Institute, West Bank
 Sir Ellis Kadoorie Secondary School (West Kowloon), Hong Kong
 Kadoorie Synagogue, Portugal
 Palestine Technical University – Kadoorie, West Bank